Nineteenth Amendment may refer to:

Nineteenth Amendment of the Constitution of India, which enabled trial of election petitions by High Courts
Nineteenth Amendment of the Constitution of Ireland, which introduced changes to Articles 2 and 3 of the constitution required by the Good Friday Agreement
Nineteenth Amendment to the Constitution of Pakistan, which made many amendments to the existing articles
Nineteenth Amendment to the Constitution of Sri Lanka, which established the Constitutional Council, proposed the Independent Commissions 
Nineteenth Amendment to the United States Constitution, which prohibited states and the federal government from denying the right to vote on the basis of sex.